In fishing, a gaff is a handheld pole with a sharp hook or sideway spike on the distal end, which is used to swing and stab into the body of a large fish like a pickaxe, and then pull the fish out of the water like using a pike pole. Ideally, the tip of the hook/spike is placed under the fish's backbone.

Gaffs are used when the weight of the target fish exceeds the breaking strength of the fishing line or the fishing rod and thus typical angling retrieval would be problematic. A gaff cannot be used if it is intended to release the fish unharmed after capture, unless the fish is skillfully gaffed right in the lip, jaw or lower gill using a thin hook. 

A "flying gaff" is a specialized type of gaff used for securing and controlling very large fish.  The hook part of the gaff (the head) detaches when sufficient force is used, somewhat like a harpoon's dart. The head is secured to the boat with a length of heavy rope or cable.

See also 
 Spearfishing
 Snagging

Recreational fishing
Fishing equipment
Nautical terminology